Miss 139 is a 1921 American silent crime drama film produced by A. H. Fischer and distributed by Jans Film Service and Sherman Productions Corporation. B. A. Rolfe was the director and Charles A. Logue wrote the story and the screenplay. Its Swedish-born star Diana Allen had been a Ziegfeld girl.

The film is now lost.

Cast
 Diana Allen as Yvonne La Rue
 Marc McDermott as Professor John Breede
 Eugene Strong as Captain Marlowe
 E. J. Ratcliffe as Martin Cardine
 Tatjana Irrah as The squirrel
 Sally Crute as Vera Cardine
 John L. Shine as Professor Apollo Cawber  
 Gordon Standing as La Gendre
 James Ryan as Operative

Production
Likely finished in 1920 but not released until the next year, the film was retitled as Amazing Lovers for its 1921 release.

References

External links

 

1921 films
American silent feature films
1921 crime drama films
American crime drama films
American black-and-white films
Lost American films
1921 drama films
1921 lost films
Films directed by B. A. Rolfe
1920s American films
Silent American drama films